Óscar Mario Jorge (born 14 July 1936) is an Argentine Justicialist Party politician who was governor of La Pampa Province from 2007 to 2015.

Born in Caleufú, La Pampa, Jorge enrolled at the National University of La Pampa, and earned a degree in Accountancy. He taught in the discipline from 1965 to 1986, and served as Comptroller of the Province from 1973 to 1976.

Jorge was appointed as provincial Economy Minister by governor Rubén Marín in 1983, serving until 1989, and was named Rector of the National University of La Pampa. He was elected as Mayor of Santa Rosa, capital of La Pampa, in 1991, and served for three consecutive terms until 2003. He was then appointed as President of the Bank of La Pampa.

In 2007, Jorge beat his former mentor Rubén Marín in the Justicialist primary for the governorship of La Pampa. He was elected, besting Radical Senator Juan Carlos Marino, and again defeated Marino for re-election in 2011.

External links
Gobierno de la Provincia de La Pampa

References

1936 births
Living people
People from La Pampa Province
Argentine accountants
Academic staff of the National University of La Pampa
Justicialist Party politicians
Governors of La Pampa Province
Mayors of places in Argentina